Hwang Ho-Lyeong  (born 15 October 1984) is a South Korean footballer who plays for Gyeongju KHNP FC in the Korea National League.

Career
Hwang began his playing career with Jeju United in 2007. He was picked as the first player of Jeju United in the draft and it was his first challenge to K-League after he tried to enter European clubs leagues such as Ligue 1, Belgian Pro League, and Major League Soccer.

Club career statistics
As of 30 December 2013.

References

1984 births
Living people
South Korean footballers
Association football midfielders
Jeju United FC players
Cheonan City FC players